"Chameleon" is a jazz standard composed by Herbie Hancock with Bennie Maupin, Paul Jackson and Harvey Mason, all of whom also performed the original 15:44 full-length version on the 1973 album Head Hunters, and featuring solos by Hancock and Maupin. The 9:41 edit omits an out-of-tune segment, features a new bassline added in at around 6:40 and new instruments added in post-production.

Background
The song has a characteristic bass line and is set to a funk beat.  For the most part, it is built entirely on a two-chord vamp: a i-IV in B Dorian (Bm7 and E7). The piece's signature 12-note bass line was played by Hancock on an ARP Odyssey, as was one of the keyboard solos. The other keyboard solo was played on a Rhodes piano.

Chart performance

Other recordings
The piece is one of the most widely recognized jazz standards, and has become standard repertoire in many small jazz ensembles. It has been performed by various artists including:
Maceo Parker
Buddy Rich
Stanley Jordan
Big Sam's Funky Nation
Maynard Ferguson
Eddie Jefferson
Gov't Mule
Jazz Warriors
Monty Alexander with Sly Dunbar & Robbie Shakespeare
Michał Urbaniak
The String Cheese Incident
Umphrey's McGee
James Morrison

References

1970s jazz standards
Songs written by Herbie Hancock
Funk songs
Jazz-funk songs
Jazz fusion standards